RegiStax is image processing software for amateur astrophotographers, released as freeware, designed to run under Windows, but which also runs on Linux, under wine.

Its purpose is to produce enhanced images of astronomic observations through combining consecutive photographs (an image "stack") of the same scene that were taken over a short period of time.  The process relies on the subject (e.g. a planet) being unchanged between photographs, so that any differences can be assumed to be random noise or atmospheric interference.

The stack of images can be in the form of individual consecutive shots or from frames of a movie camera trained on the scene.

History
Cor Berrevoets (Netherlands) began development of the program about 2001, and it was released on 19 May 2002.  This initial release (version v1.0.0) had facilities for stack alignment, grading and selection of the images to be merged, and image enhancement using techniques such as wavelet processing.  The program was regularly updated by its author and on 6 June 2004 a multi-lingual version was begun (v3) and the program was later available in 15 different languages.  To date (September 2022) the latest release is v6.1.0.8 (6 May 2011) which was contributed to by a team of 9 people.

See also 

 Shift and add image processing technique
 Speckle imaging
 Lucky Imaging
 PlanetarySystemStacker

References

External links
 Official RegiStax Website.
 Basic RegiStax 6 tutorial

Astronomy software
Science education software
Pascal (programming language) software